James Joseph McConn (March 15, 1928 – March 14, 1997) was the mayor of Houston, Texas from 1978 to 1982. He remains the last Republican to hold that office as of 2022.

McConn was born in Tulsa, Oklahoma.  He moved with his family to Houston in 1939, where he met Marjorie Gougenheim, whom he married in 1947.  He attended the University of Notre Dame in South Bend, Indiana, and then returned to Houston, where he became engaged in the building-materials business and then in home construction.

He became president of the Greater Houston Homebuilders Association in 1969, and from there became known in local politics, having been appointed to a vacant seat on the Houston City Council by then Mayor Louie Welch in 1971.  He was reelected to the council in 1973, but did not run in 1975.  In 1977, he ran for mayor.  In the first round, he lost by a large margin to conservative former district attorney Frank Briscoe, but he won the runoff election due in large part to support from minority voters and endorsements from other first-round candidates.  He won reelection in 1979 against councilman Louis Macey, but lost to Kathy Whitmire in 1981.

After leaving office, McConn served as vice president of the Houston Sports Association, which at the time owned the Houston Astros baseball team (1981–1989), and as director of the Greater Houston Convention and Visitors Bureau (1989–1997). He died of cancer at the age of sixty-eight.

References

Mayors of Houston
University of Notre Dame alumni
Texas Republicans
1928 births
1997 deaths
Businesspeople from Texas
Politicians from Tulsa, Oklahoma
20th-century American businesspeople
20th-century American politicians
Businesspeople from Tulsa, Oklahoma